Georgina Rich (born 1976) is a British actress. Her stage credits include Honour (2006), As You Like It (2011), Richard III (2017), and playing Baby Houseman in the West End production of the musical Dirty Dancing in 2006. Her numerous television credits include the BBC One dramas Cuffs (2015) and River (2015), and the Black Mirror episode Hated in the Nation (2016). She also played Wallis Simpson in the 2017 Channel 5 drama-documentary, Wallis: The Queen That Never Was.

Filmography

External links

British actresses
Living people
Alumni of RADA
1976 births